Greater Nepal is an irrendentist ideal of Nepal extending beyond its present boundaries to include current Indian and Bangladeshi territories. The territorial claims typically include the Nepali borders between 1791 and 1816, concluding with the signing of the Sugali Treaty at the end of the Anglo-Nepalese War, but not the parts of Tibet occupied by the Gorkha army during the Sino-Nepalese War of 1788–1792.

Background 
It is claimed the historical "Greater Nepal" extended from the Sutlej to the Teesta River in 1813, spanning 1,500 km. Gorkha rule over this expanse was brief, however, and in the aftermath of the 1814-1815 war with the East India Company the Gorkhali realm was whittled down considerably. The real time Gorkhali presence in Garhwal was for 12 years, Kumaon for 24 years, and Sikkim for 33 years. The Treaty of Sugauli, between the Gorkhali king and the East India Company, was ratified in 1816. It caused Nepal's rulers to lose about 176,000 (according to greater Nepal map ) km2 of territory and left Nepal with its present-day borders, with 147,516 km2 total area.

Greater Nepal Nationalist Front 

Greater Nepal Nationalist Front (GNNF) is a Nepalese NGO headed by Phanindra Nepal, which champions the cause of Greater Nepal. The organisation disowns the 1810 Sugauli Treaty and the 1950 Treaty of Peace and Friendship with India. It demands the return of the land that belonged to Nepal before the signing of the Sugauli Treaty. This involves land up to the Sutlej River in the west, the Teesta River in the east ("Shimla to Darjeeling" in the organisation's parlance) and extending up to Varanasi in the south.

Scholars Mishra and Haque state that the organisation is rhetorically very powerful. The map of Greater Nepal produced by the organisation provides power to the movement by building "meanings and nostalgic longings". The movement has a web page in the Nepali language, a Facebook page and blog sites. Its agenda has also been coopted by the Unified Nepal National Front.

An even more grandiose movement is said to talk about "Unified Gorkha-States of India Sub-Continent", which restructures the Indian subcontinent into five autonomous states, the largest of which is the so-called "Arya Autonomous State".

Maoists 
A Maoist movement has published a 260-page Nepali book titled "Nepal: Teesta Dekhi Satlej Samma" ("Nepal: From Teesta to the Sutlej") which, while repeating similar demands to the GNNF, also provides copious references to alleged historical facts. Among others, it claims that the Indian prime minister Jawaharlal Nehru supported the idea of "Greater Nepal".
Their map includes the Indian towns of Varanasi, Ballia, Bahraich, Pilibhit and Jaunpur.

The Maoist leader Prachanda dismissed the claims in an interview with the Times of India as a "media-created stunt". But according to the Times of India the book is readily available in and around the Maoist camps along the Indo-Nepal border.

Scholars 
Scholars and retired officials such as Buddhi Narayan Shrestha (former Director of the Survey Department) and Dwarika Nath Dhungel (former secretary of Water Resources) have published scholarly articles with maps labelled "Greater Nepal".
Shrestha has also spoken in Greater Nepal gatherings
and made media comments in its favour:

Shreshta narrates that, before the Sugauli Treaty, Nepal extended up to the confluence of Gandak and Ganges Rivers in the south, and to Shigatse and Tashilhunpo in the north. "It was called the 'Greater Nepal'", he states, without mentioning who called it so. British India apparently "did not like" Greater Nepal as a unified country and therefore dismembered it. He alleges that the British wanted to expand trade into Tibet but, since Nepal stood in the way, they needed to cut it down.

Official position of Nepal government and political parties
No king of Nepal has ever discussed or approved of the concept of "Greater Nepal". However, upon forming a coalition government after the 2008 Nepalese Constituent Assembly election, the leader of the Communist Party of Nepal (Maoist) and then-prime minister Pushpa Kamal Dahal (who had spent 10 years of his life in India after being declared a terrorist by the Nepalese government) stated that the 1950 Indo-Nepal Treaty of Peace and Friendship would be "scrapped". However, the matter was pursued no further. He resigned nine months later for other reasons. Late Nepali Prime Minister Girija Prasad Koirala called the idea of Greater Nepal "a product of unstable minds". According to Kanak Mani Dixit, as of 1993, the mainstream Left of Nepal appears ambivalent: "They like the concept but are unwilling to do anything about it."

Present-day view
There is no official claim by the Government of Nepal or any political party of Nepal to take back the territory ceded to British East India Company by Nepal which is now territory of India. The view is, however advocated for by some Nepali political parties as well as an NGO called the Greater Nepal Nationalist Front.

See also
 Unification of Nepal
 Politics in Nepal

References

Bibliography

External links
 
Border Nepal – Border Management of Nepal
 
 

1816 in law
History of Nepal
India–Nepal relations
Nepal
Politics of Nepal
Unification of Nepal
Gurkhas
Nepalese nationalism